Miller Farm or Miller Farmstead may refer to:

United States
(by state)
 Miller Farmstead (La Crosse, Kansas), listed on the listed on the National Register of Historic Places (NRHP) in Rush County
 Miller Farmstead (Minden, Louisiana), listed on the NRHP in Webster Parish
 Routzahn-Miller Farmstead, Middletown, Maryland, listed on the NRHP in Frederick County
 Wilson-Miller Farm, Sharpsburg, Maryland, listed on the NRHP in Washington County
 Miller Farmstead (Penwell, New Jersey), Anderson and Changewater, New Jersey, listed on the NRHP in Hunterdon and Warren counties
 Miller Farm (Baltimore, Ohio), listed on the NRHP in Fairfield County
 Miller Farmstead (Roan Mountain, Tennessee), located in Roan Mountain State Park
 Martin-Miller Farm, Rowland Station, Tennessee, listed on the NRHP in Warren County

See also
Miller House (disambiguation)